Libertad, officially the Municipality of Libertad, is a 5th class municipality in the province of Misamis Oriental, Philippines. According to the 2020 census, it has a population of 12,948 people.

Libertad is known for its Barungoy Festival and is also home to the Initao–Libertad Protected Landscape and Seascape which it shares with neighboring Initao municipality.

Geography

Barangays
Libertad is politically subdivided into 9 barangays.
 Dulong
 Gimaylan
 Kimalok
 Lubluban
 Poblacion
 Retablo
 Santo Niño
 Tangkub
 Taytayan

Climate

Demographics

Economy

References

External links
 [ Philippine Standard Geographic Code]
Philippine Census Information
Local Governance Performance Management System

Municipalities of Misamis Oriental